|}

The Poplar Square Chase is a Grade 3 National Hunt steeplechase in Ireland. It is run at Naas Racecourse in late October or early November over a distance of about 2 miles (3,218 metres).

The race was first run in 1997 and was awarded Grade 3 status in 2003. It was run as a Grade 2 race as a one-off in 2020.

Records
Leading jockey  (3 wins):
 Davy Russell–  Thyne Again (2008), Noble Prince (2011), Moscow Mannon (2014)

Leading trainer (3 wins):
 Willie Mullins -  	Twinlight (2013), Devils Bride (2015), Cilaos Emery (2019) 
 Henry de Bromhead -  Moscow Mannon (2014), Notebook (2020), Captain Guinness (2021)

Winners

See also
 Horse racing in Ireland
 List of Irish National Hunt races

References

Racing Post:

National Hunt chases
National Hunt races in Ireland
Naas Racecourse
1997 establishments in Ireland
Recurring sporting events established in 1997